Architectural and ethnographic museum Khokhlovka is an open-air museum in Perm Krai, Russia. It is located in the Perm municipal district, on the right bank of the Kama River, 43 km from Perm. It was founded in 1969 and opened for visitors in 1980. It is the first open-air architectural museum of wooden architecture in the Ural.

Khokhovka includes 23 unique monuments from the 17th – early 20th centuries. The territory is about 35 ha with many wooden constructions and buildings that were moved here from different places of the Perm Krai.

It is one of the most important tourist attractions in the Perm Krai.

Collection 
Church of the Transfiguration (Церковь Преображения) 1702, from the Cherdynsky District
Church of Our Lady (Церковь Богородицы) 1694, from the Suksunsky District
Watchtower 1905 (copy of 17th century original), from the Suksunsky District
Bell tower 1781, from the Suksunsky District
Unique production cell of the Ust'-Borovskoy Salt Factory from Solikamsk, 1880s
Izba of Kudymov  (Изба Кудымова) 19th century, Yusvinsky District
Threshing floor with barn (Гумно с овином) 1920, Kudymkarsky District
Windmill, 19th century, from the Ochyorsky District
and others

Festivals and holidays 
The museum regularly hosts various ethnic and cultural festivals and holidays. In winter it's Maslenitsa (February or March). The most important summer events are The military reconstruction festival Great Maneuvers on the Khokhlovka's Hills and the ethnofuturistic international festival KAMWA, which are held every year in Khokhlovka.

External links 
Official website (Russian)
Official website of festival Kamwa

Architecture museums
Museums in Perm Krai
Open-air museums in Russia
Ethnographic museums in Russia
Cultural heritage monuments in Perm Krai